Hiding is an Australian television drama series which screened on ABC1 from 5 February 2015. The eight-part series follows a Gold Coast family in witness protection who must build a new life in a strange city, Sydney. It is created by Matt Ford and directed by Shawn Seet, Tori Garrett and Grant Brown.

Synopsis
After a botched drug deal, Troy (James Stewart) must take his family into Witness Protection in exchange for giving evidence against his former employer, vicious crime boss Nils Vandenberg (Marcus Graham).

With new names and fresh identities, the Quigg family is ripped from their home on the sun-drenched Gold Coast and dumped in a safe house in Western Sydney as the Swift Family. But dislocation puts immense pressure on everyone.

Lincoln Swift's cover as a post-doctorate fellow in the Criminal Psychology Department of a Sydney university challenges him in fundamental ways. He's told to keep his head down and meet with handler John Pinder (Stephen Curry) to prepare his testimony. But the academic teachings of the department begin to conflict with Lincoln's real-life experience.

Lincoln's wife, Rebecca (Kate Jenkinson), has to give up her nursing career and cease all contact with her mother Jenny (Paula Duncan), brother Kosta Krilich (Nathan Page), and her very pregnant sister-in-law and best friend Dimity (Jodi Gordon). Isolation and the pressure of keeping her family safe take their toll, and Rebecca reaches out to an old friend with serious consequences.

A bureaucratic bungle lands Mitchell (Lincoln Younes) and Tara (Olivia DeJonge) in a performing arts school. While it’s a happy outcome for aspirational fifteen-year-old Tara, it's torture for seventeen-year-old surfer, Mitchell, who is desperate to get his old life back, especially his gorgeous girlfriend, Kelly (Jenna Kratzel). Adding to the teenager's torment, no phones or Facebook, no texts or Twitter. Because a trace could bring a killer to their door.

As the dysfunctional Swift family adjusts to their new world living with constant threat of corrupt cops or a leak within Witness Protection, a surprise phone call unleashes an emotional upheaval that could crack their cover and bring those who want Lincoln silenced gunning for him and those he loves.

Cast
 James Stewart as Lincoln Swift / Troy Quigg
 Kate Jenkinson as Rebecca Swift / Marie Quigg
 Lincoln Younes as Mitchell Swift / Mitchell Quigg
 Olivia DeJonge as Tara Swift / Shaneen Quigg
 Cariba Heine as Harriet
 Marcus Graham as Nils Vandenberg 
 Stephen Curry as Detective John Pinder
 Nathan Page as Kosta Krilich
 Jodi Gordon as Dimity Krilich
 Paula Duncan as Jenny Krilich
 Jacqueline McKenzie as Ferdine Lamay 
 Mitchell Butel as Isaac Ulrich
 Kim Gyngell as Warwick Darmody
 Natasha Beaumont as Rayburn
 Jenna Kratzel as Kelly
 Alan Flower as Denallo
 Winnie Liu as Shantelle

Episodes

External links
 
 Official website
 Production website

References 

2015 Australian television series debuts
2015 Australian television series endings
Australian Broadcasting Corporation original programming
English-language television shows
Television series about witness protection
Television series by Playmaker Media